Yuliya Valeryevna Kuzina (also Yulia Kuzina, ; born October 25, 1976 in Orsk, Orenburg Oblast) is a Russian judoka, who played for the middleweight category. She won a bronze medal for the 63 kg division at the 2004 European Judo Championships in Bucharest, Romania.

Career 
Kuzina made her official debut for the 2000 Summer Olympics in Sydney, where she competed in the women's middleweight class (70 kg). She defeated Côte d'Ivoire's Lea Zahoui Blavo in the preliminary rounds, before losing out the quarterfinal match by an ippon and an uchi mata (inner thigh throw) to South Korea's Cho Min-Sun. Kuzina offered another shot for the bronze medal by entering the repechage bouts, but she lost her first match, with three yuko and a harai makikomi (hip sweep wraparound), to Italy's Ylenia Scapin.

Eight years after competing in her first Olympics, Kuzina qualified for the women's 70 kg class, as a 31-year-old, at the 2008 Summer Olympics in Beijing, by placing fifth from the European Judo Championships in Lisbon. Kuzina lost the preliminary round of sixteen match, by a yuko, to Hungary's Anett Mészáros, although she received two shidos (penalties) for using the non-combativity technique.

References

External links
 
 

 NBC 2008 Olympics profile

Russian female judoka
Living people
Olympic judoka of Russia
Judoka at the 2000 Summer Olympics
Judoka at the 2008 Summer Olympics
People from Orsk
1976 births
Sportspeople from Orenburg Oblast